Thomas Wardrope Eadie (July 26, 1898 – September 6, 1986) born in Ottawa and died at Pierrefonds Manor QC.  Son of Robert and Flora (Stewart) President of Bell Canada from July 1, 1953 to July 31, 1963 - Thomas Eadie graduated from McGill University (Engineering) in 1923 and immediately signed on with Bell Canada and over the next 30 years he occupied a succession of engineering and administrative positions before his appointment as president of Bell Canada. In the 1950s, Mr. Eadie presided over the company's role in building the Trans Canada Microwave System, now recognized as one of the major engineering feats of the last century.

See also
 Thomas W. Eadie Medal
 Marcel Vincent
 Charles Fleetford Sise
 CBLT

References

20th-century Canadian businesspeople
1898 births
1986 deaths